Eucalyptus × alpina, commonly known as Grampians gum, is a mallee or small tree that is endemic to the  Grampians in Victoria, Australia. It has fibrous grey bark near its base and smooth greyish bark higher up. The leaves are broadly lance-shaped to egg-shaped and the plant has very warty buds and fruit. There is disagreement about its name, the Royal Botanic Gardens Victoria referring to it as the Mt Abrupt stringybark.

Description
It has fibrous grey bark on its trunk and lower stems and smooth greyish bark further up. The leaves on young plants are broadly egg-shaped to more or less circular and the same dark green on both sides. The flower buds lack a pedicel and are oval to more or less spherical and very warty.

Taxonomy and naming
Eucalyptus × alpina was first formally described in 1838 by botanist John Lindley and the description was published in Thomas Mitchell's Three Expeditions into the interior of Eastern Australia based on plant material collected during his 1836 expedition. The Royal Botanic Gardens Victoria gives this species the name E. verrucata P.Ladiges & Whiffin, the Mt Abrupt stringybark.

Distribution and habitat
The Grampians gum mostly grows in pure stands on the higher parts of the Grampians National Park.

References

Flora of Victoria (Australia)
Trees of Australia
alpina
Myrtales of Australia
Taxa named by John Lindley
Plants described in 1838
Plant nothospecies